This is a list of venues used for professional baseball in and around Omaha, Nebraska. The information is a synthesis of the information contained in the references listed.

Omaha "ball grounds"
Home of: Omaha Mashers or Green Stockings – Northwestern League (1879 – league disbanded during season)
Location: "in Lake's addition, at the northern terminus of the street railway" – somewhere near 18th and Lake Streets – "about 18th and Ohio" [2 blocks south of Locust]
Currently: residential

Omaha Baseball Grounds
Home of:
Omaha Omahogs – Western League (1885 part season)
Omaha Omahogs or Union Pacifics – WL (1887)
Omaha Omahogs or Omahosses / Lambs – Western Association (1888–1891)
Omaha Omahogs – WL (1892 part season)
Location: North 20th Street (east, first base); buildings and Locust Street (north, right field); buildings and North 22nd Street (west, left field); Miami Street (south, third base); Maple Street teed into the property on the left field side [per 1890 Sanborn map] – about a mile north-northwest of the site of TD Ameritrade Park
Later: Y.M.C.A. Park, then University Park [University Athletic Club]  
Currently: residential

Charles Street Park
Home of: Omaha Omahogs or Indians – Western Association (1894–mid-1895)
Location: Charles Street; 17th Street (east); 18th Street (west)
Afterward: converted to bicycle race track after ball club moved to Fair Grounds
Currently: residential and commercial

Fair Grounds
Home of Omaha Omahogs or Indians – WA (part of 1895, after leaving Charles Street – then moved to Denver)
Location: Ames Avenue between 16th Street and 20th Street
Currently: residential

Omaha Base Ball Park or Ames Avenue Park
Home of: Omaha Omahogs or Babes – WL (1898 part season – moved to St. Joseph)
Location: Ames Avenue (south, home plate); 24th Street (east); 25th Street (west) – "where the Prairie Park addition is now located"
Later: another Y.M.C.A. Park
Currently: commercial businesses

Omaha Baseball Park a.k.a. Rourke's Park or Vinton Street Park or Western League Park or League Park 
Home of:
Omaha Omahogs/Indians/Rangers/Rourkes/Buffaloes/Crickets/Packers – WL (1900–mid-1935 – moved to Council Bluffs Rails)
Omaha Robin Hoods – WL (1936 part season – moved to Rock Island after ballpark burned)
Location: 2519 South 15th Street (west, third base); Vinton Street (south, first base); buildings and Castelar Street (north, left field); buildings and South 13th Street (east, right field) [per 1901 Sanborn map] – about half a mile north of the site of Rosenblatt Stadium
Currently: residential

ballpark at Lake Manawa
Home of: Council Bluffs Bluffers – Iowa–South Dakota League (1903 part season)
Location: near Lake Manawa, south of Council Bluffs, Iowa
Currently: Lake Manawa State Park

American Legion Park or Broadway Park
Home of:
Council Bluffs Rails – WL (mid-1935, moved from Omaha Packers)
Omaha Cardinals – WL (1947–1948)
Location: Council Bluffs, Iowa – West Broadway (north, left field); 35th Street (west, third base); buildings and 34th Street (east, right field); railroad tracks (south, first base) [per city directory]
Currently: commercial businesses

Johnny Rosenblatt Stadium orig. Omaha Baseball Park or Municipal Stadium
Home of:
Omaha Cardinals – WL / American Association (1949–1959)
Omaha Dodgers – AA 1961–1962
Omaha Royals – AA / Pacific Coast League 1969–2010
College World Series (1950–2010)
Location: Deer Park Boulevard (later Grover Street, now Bob Gibson Boulevard) (north, left field); South 13th Street (west, third base); B Street (later Bert Murphy Avenue South) (south, first base); South 10th Street (east, right field); Omaha's Henry Doorly Zoo (east and northeast, right and center fields, across 10th Street)
Currently: zoo parking lot; ballpark partially preserved, as "Infield at the Zoo"

Charles Schwab Field Omaha orig. TD Ameritrade Park Omaha
Home of: 
College World Series (2011–present)
Creighton Bluejays baseball (2011–present)
Location: 1200 Mike Fahey Street (south, right field); North 13th Street (west, first base); Cuming Street (north, third base); South 10th Street (east, left field)

Werner Park
Home of:
Omaha Royals/Golden Spikes/Royals/Storm Chasers – PCL (2011–present)
Omaha Mavericks (NCAA) 2013−2020
Location: (Papillion, Nebraska) 12356 Ballpark Way (south, first base); South 126th Street (west, third base); Lincoln Road (north, left field); South 123rd Street (east, right field)

References
Peter Filichia, Professional Baseball Franchises, Facts on File, 1993.
Omaha City Directories – various years – via Ancestry.com

See also
Lists of baseball parks

External links
 Sanborn map showing the 20th Street ballpark as of 1890 - rotated to orient north
 Sanborn map showing most of the 15th Street ballpark as of 1901
 Sanborn map showing part of the 15th Street ballpark as of 1901
 A 1964 thesis on Omaha baseball history
 Nebraska ballparks
 Early Omaha ballparks
 Charles Street park
 Some pictures of Rourke Park
 Western League
 Rourke Park

Omaha
Baseball venues in Nebraska
Sports venues in Omaha, Nebraska
baseball parks